Circle is the fourteenth studio album by Japanese Pop band Deen. It was released on 18 December 2013 under the new label Epic Records Japan.

Background
The album consists of two previously released single, Hatachi/Ame no Roppongi and Mou Nakanaide. Mou Nakanaide'''s coupling song Future had received new arrangement under title Album Version.

Kouji Yamane's new song of Shangai Rock Star series had been released in this album as well.

For first time after four years, they collaborated again with the Paris Match on the song Peace & Smile.

Hirohito Furui, ex.member of Japanese pop band Garnet Crow has been involved in the album production of Deen for the first time after 15 years.

This album was released in two formats: regular CD edition and limited CD+DVD edition. The limited edition includes DVD footage of their live performance  Deen Aor Night Cruisin' ~2nd GROOVE~''.

Charting
The album reached #21 in its first week and charted for 3 weeks, selling 5,000+ copies.

Track listing

References

Sony Music albums
Japanese-language albums
2013 albums
Deen (band) albums